The Alabama Sports Festival was founded in 1982 at the request of the United States Olympic Committee and is a member of the National Congress of State Games. The Summer Games, an effort of the Alabama Sports Festival, Inc., is a 501(c)3 non-profit organization, providing opportunities to compete in Olympic-style games.

Sports
In 2010, competition was held in the following sports:

 Archery/Bow-hunting
 Baseball
 Basketball
 Bowling
 Cycling
 Disc golf
 Diving
 Flag football
 Football 7 on 7
 Gymnastics
 Lacrosse
 Shooting Sports
 Soccer
 Softball
 Swimming
 Taekwondo
 Track and field
 Triathlon
 Volleyball

References
 Crenshaw, Jr, Solomon (June 20, 2008) "Let the games begin: Alabama Sports Festival with venue map and more." Birmingham News

External links
 Alabama Sports Festival official site

1982 establishments in Alabama
Multi-sport events in the United States
Recurring sporting events established in 1982
Sports in Alabama
Sports festivals in the United States